John Grimshaw  (born 1945) is a voice for cyclists in the UK.

Sustrans, run by Grimshaw, started the National Cycle Routes. The signposts are a cycle with a number outlined in red. Also, on the routes, there is usually a cast-iron signpost. Grimshaw has a signpost in his front garden as a reminder of his work.

After 30 years with Sustrans, Grimshaw decided to step down from the role of Chief Executive, wanting to pursue other opportunities.

After stepping down, Grimshaw remained active advising and surveying potential new cycle routes for Cycling England before its abolition in 2011.

Personal life
Grimshaw married his first wife, Rosalind, and moved to Clifton, Bristol looking over the Clifton Suspension Bridge. He fathered four children with Rosalind. The couple divorced in the mid-1980s. Now, Grimshaw is with his partner, Sue, in Clifton Wood, Bristol.

A cousin is the architect Sir Nicholas Grimshaw.

Honours
 Honorary Master of Science (MSc) from University of Bristol (2007)
 Appointed an CBE in the Queen's Birthday Honours, for services to the development of the national cycle network. (2008)

References

Further reading
 

1945 births
Alumni of Gonville and Caius College, Cambridge
Kenyan emigrants to the United Kingdom
British civil engineers
Sustainable transport pioneers
Commanders of the Order of the British Empire
Living people
People from Clifton, Bristol